Derrick Mensah (born 17 November 2003) is a Ghanaian footballer who currently plays as a defender for Ghana Premier League side WAFA.

Career 
Mensah started his career with West African Football Academy, he was promoted to the senior team in March 2021 ahead of the second round of the 2020–21 season. Two months after, he made his debut on 12 May 2021 as a starter against Medeama, played 67 minutes before being substituted for Derrick Mensah Antwi who also came on to make his debut. The match ended in a 2–1 win over Medeama SC. During his debut season, he made 11 league appearances.

References

External links 

 

2003 births
Living people
Association football defenders
Ghanaian footballers
West African Football Academy players
Ghana Premier League players